Kasper Jørgensen may refer to:
 Kasper Jørgensen (handballer)
 Kasper Jørgensen (footballer)
 Kasper Winther Jørgensen, Danish rower